TV Comic was a British comic book magazine published weekly from 9 November 1951 until 29 June 1984. Featuring stories based on television series running at the time of publication, it was the first British comic to be based around TV programmes; it spawned a host of imitators.

Publication history 
Originally started by News of the World, TV Comics was later sold to Beaverbrook Newspapers, and then to TV Publications in 1960 (which became Polystyle Publications in 1968).

The first issue ran to eight pages, with Muffin the Mule on the front cover. It also featured many other TV favourites of the day, including Mr. Pastry, Larry the Lamb, Tom Puss, Prince Valiant (Hal Foster reprint), Jack & Jill and Prudence Kitten.

In common with other British children's comics, TV Comic absorbed other, less successful titles (including those of its competitors) during its run. These included TV Land and TV Express (City Magazines) in 1962, TV Action (formerly Countdown) in 1973, Tom and Jerry Weekly (Spotlight Publications) in 1974 (Tom and Jerry already featured in TV Comic), and the short-lived Target in 1978.

Editors of TV Comic included Dick Millington (who also edited Pippin and created Mighty Moth), Robin Tucheck, and John Lynott. Artists included Bill Titcombe, John Canning, Neville Main, H. Watts, Gerry Haylock, Mike Lacey, and Steve Maher.

Title changes 
 TV Comic (1951–1973, issues #1–1132)
 TV Comic + TV Action (1973, issues #1133-1147, after absorbing TV Action)
 TV Comic (1973–1974, issues #1148-1181)
 TV Comic plus Tom & Jerry Weekly (1974, issues #1182-1201; after absorbing Spotlight Publications' Tom and Jerry Weekly)
 TV Comic (1974–1976, issues #1202-1291)
 Mighty TV Comic (1976–1977, issues #1292-1352)
 TV Comic (1977–1978, issues #1353-1392)
 TV Comic with Target (1978, issues #1393-1401, after absorbing Target)
 TV Comic (1978–1984, issues #1402-1697)

Content
For the first decade of its existence, the publication was aimed explicitly at younger children. As well as Muffin the Mule (which ran for nearly 10 years—as the cover feature until 1955, then later as a half-page in black and white), other favourites from the 1950s that made appearances were Sooty, Coco the Clown, Noddy and Lenny the Lion. As the decade passed, so the comic began to acquire a slightly more "grown-up" feel, with stories such as Treasure Island, The Lone Ranger and Black Beauty all appearing for a time. Text stories also began to be featured, with religious themes such as "Jesus and the Bible".

TV Comic printed Doctor Who stories from 1964 to 1979 (except for the period between 1971 and 1973, when the strip was instead published in another Polystyle title, Countdown/TV Action). It also featured strip cartoons for the early puppet TV series produced by Gerry Anderson and AP Films—Four Feather Falls, Supercar and Fireball XL5—until Anderson's titles became the focus of a rival publication, TV Century 21.

The issues published in the 1960s are considered the most collectable in the comic's history. As well as Doctor Who and Anderson strips, other highly collectable material included Telegoons (which ran from 1963 to 1967), Space Patrol (from 1964 to 1965) and The Avengers (based on the TV series featuring John Steed; initially from 1965 to 1966 and again from 1968 to 1972). A number of annuals and holiday specials were also issued over the years, including special editions concentrating on characters such as the Pink Panther and Tom and Jerry. TV Comic also carried a series of Star Trek strips some months before the original series began to be broadcast by BBC television in the UK from Summer 1969. (The Star Trek strip also migrated to the rival TV21 (formerly TV Century 21).

Format
From the start, TV Comic featured a mixture of colour and black-and-white pages, a policy that continued throughout its publication. TV Comic had quite a tempestuous history towards the end of its life. In 1976 (from issue 1,292) it was re-launched as Mighty TV Comic, switching to a large tabloid format. Although the pages were larger, the amount of content did not grow, with the frames of many strips simply increasing in size. The first two of the new issues were accompanied by a smaller "Mighty Midget" supplement.

This evidently failed to attract the sales increases that had been hoped for, as the comic reverted to an A4 format from issue 1,377 two years later, now published on cheap newsprint. Although the paper quality eventually improved, the comic came to rely heavily on reprints of older material, or using scripts from old strips with new characters. The only notable, collectable and original strip of this period was perhaps Battle of the Planets (drawn by former Dan Dare artist Keith Watson), which ran from 1981 to 1983.

The publication ultimately closed in 1984, after 33 years, due to declining sales. The last issue contained no warning in its pages of the title's discontinuation, nor of it being merged with another comic; instead, TV Comic simply failed to appear the following week. However, both The A-Team and the Tales of the Gold Monkey strips, which had been running until this point, concluded with frames stating "The End".

Features

TV programmes

Adam Adamant
Animal Magic
Astronut
The A-Team
The Avengers
Barney Bear
Basil Brush
Battle of the Planets
Bob Monkhouse's Mad Movies Featuring the Keystone Kops
Bootsie and Snudge
Bugs Bunny
Buzby
Cannon
Captain Pugwash
Catweazle
Charlie's Angels
Dad's Army
Deputy Dawg
The Dickie Henderson Family
Doctor Who
Droopy
The Dukes of Hazzard
Fireball XL5
The Flaxton Boys
Foo Foo and GoGo
Four Feather Falls
 Grasshopper Island
Hägar the Horrible
How?
The Inspector
 Ken Dodd's Diddymen
 Jack & Jill
Kojak
Larry the Lamb
Laurel and Hardy
Lenny the Lion
Mr. Merlin
 Mr Pastry
The Milky Bar Kid
Muffin the Mule
 Noddy
Orlando
The Pink Panther Show
Popeye
 Prudence Kitten
Road Runner
Rod Hull and Emu
Roobarb
Skippy the Bush Kangaroo
Sooty
Space Patrol
Star Trek
Supercar
Tales of the Gold Monkey
Target
Tarzan
The Telegoons
Tom and Jerry

Others
Arthur!
The Bakers' Dozen
Beetle Bailey
 Black Beauty
Coco the Clown
Dad
The Incredible Bulk
Lochy the Loch Ness Monster
 The Lone Ranger
Mighty Moth
Nellie and Her Telly
 The Range Rider
TV Terrors – Cuthbert, Buttons and Monica, and their nemesis Hoppit
Texas Ted
Rudi Rabbit (1981–83)
 Treasure Island

Notable issues
Issue 1 (9 November 1951) First Muffin the Mule (drawn by Neville Main) cover. Prince Valiant (drawn by Hal Foster) begins a run that will last until issue 44 (5 September 1952).
Issue 192 (9 July 1955) Sooty (drawn by Tony Hart) takes over full-time on the cover, although it had occasionally appeared there as a Special number since earlier in the year.
Issue 267 (15 December 1956) First Enid Blyton Noddy strip begins. It starts off its two-year run on the cover, before finishing with issue 371 (13 December 1958).
Issue 345 (14 June 1958) First Lenny the Lion (drawn by Bill Mevin) cover.
Issue 384 (14 March 1959). The comic's longest-running strip, Mighty Moth (drawn by Dick Millington) appears for the first time (but never in strip form on the cover) and runs until the comic ceases publication.
Issue 439 (14 May 1960) the strip adaptation of the first of three early Gerry Anderson-produced TV series, Four Feather Falls (drawn by Neville Main) begins, running until issue 564 (6 October 1962).
Issue 444 (18 June 1960) The Lone Ranger (drawn by Mike Noble) begins, running until issue 507 (2 September 1961).
Issue 456 (10 September 1960) First Popeye (drawn initially by Chick Henderson) cover. The strip had started with issue 449 (23 July 1960), but even after Popeye was dropped from the cover, the strip continued inside the comic into the 1980s.
Issue 482 (11 March 1961) the last appearance of Muffin the Mule in TV Comic as he is quietly dropped from the pages in only a half-page black-and-white strip.
Issue 483 (18 March 1961) another Gerry Anderson favourite, Supercar (drawn initially by H. Watts and later by Bill Mevin) starts. It runs until issue 667 (26 September 1964).
Issue 508 (9 September 1961) The Range Rider (drawn by Mike Noble and Ron Embleton) begins, running until issue 658 (25 July 1964).
Issue 565 (13 October 1962) the third and last Anderson strip to appear in TV Comic is Fireball XL5 (drawn by Neville Main), which runs until issue 672 (31 October 1964).
Issue 619 (26 October 1963) Telegoons (drawn by Bill Titcombe) first appears, running until issue 787 (14 January 1967).
Issue 668 (3 October 1964) Space Patrol (drawn by Bill Mevin), always in full colour in the centre pages, makes its first appearance and will run until issue 719 (25 September 1965).
Issue 674 (14 November 1964) Doctor Who comic strip begins (initially drawn by Neville Main). Apart from a brief absence for a few issues at the end of 1969, it runs until issue 999 (6 February 1971) and then moves to Countdown comic.
Issue 720 (2 October 1965) The Avengers (by Pat Williams) begins its first run, which will last until issue 771 (24 September 1966). The first Doctor Who colour centrespread appears (drawn by Bill Mevin; from issue 748, by John Canning).
Issue 788 (21 January 1967) First Doctor Who cover (drawn by John Canning). This commenced a six-month period of Doctor Who and the Daleks covers, which are perhaps some of the most collectable issues.
Issue 810 (24 June 1967) First Ken Dodd's Diddymen (drawn by Bill Titcombe) cover.
Issue 877 (5 January 1968) The Avengers return, running until issue 1,078 (12 August 1972).
Issue 909 (17 May 1969) First Tom & Jerry (drawn by Bill Titcombe) cover.
Issue 1,058 (25 March 1972) Dad's Army (drawn by Bill Titcombe) begins its first run up to issue 1,100 (13 January 1973), after which it moves to TV Action.
Issue 1,133 (1 September 1973) TV Action merges with TV Comic. Dad's Army returns until issue 1,275 (22 May 1976); Doctor Who also returns (drawn by Gerry Haylock and later by Martin Asbury).
Issue 1,292 (18 September 1976) Relaunch with first tabloid-style issue of Mighty TV Comic. Free Doctor Who Mighty Midget comic book. Star Trek (Gold Key comics reprints) features until issue 1,382 (9 June 1978).
Issue 1,377 (5 May 1978) Mighty TV Comic returns to its original format. Cover stars vary from Pink Panther to Charlie's Angels, Buzby and Scooby-Doo, among others.
Issue 1,393 (25 August 1978) First TV Comic, Incorporating Target. Charlie's Angels begins (drawn by John Canning), running until issue 1,451 (5 October 1979).
Issue 1,430 (11 May 1979) Final issue featuring Doctor Who. Since issue 1,386, the strip had consisted of John Canning reprints with the character of the Doctor re-drawn as his fourth incarnation, as played by Tom Baker in the TV series.
Issue 1,530 (17 April 1981) Battle of the Planets (drawn by Keith Watson, and also by Geoff Campion and Ron Tiner) begins, running until issue 1,671 (30 December 1983).
Issue 1,656 (16 September 1983) Tales of the Gold Monkey (drawn by Geoff Campion) begins
Issue 1,697 (29 June 1984) Final issue of TV Comic; Tales of the Gold Monkey concludes

See also
John and Gillian
 Notable British TV-based comics of the era:
 Doctor Who Weekly (Marvel/Panini, 1971–present) – now known as Doctor Who Magazine
 Lady Penelope (City Magazines, 1966–1969)
 Look-in (ITV/IPC, 1971–1994)
 TV Action (Polystyle, 1971–1973) – previously known as Countdown
 TV Century 21 (City Magazines, 1965–1971)
 TV Express (Beaverbrook/City Magazines, 1954–1962) – previously known as Junior Express, Junior Express Weekly, and Express Weekly
 TV Fun (Amalgamated Press, 1953–1960)
 TV Tornado (City Magazines, 1967–1968)

Notes

References

External links
 
TV Comic at the Comic Book Database
TV Comic Annuals
Examples of Bill Titcombe's artwork
Examples of Dick Millington's artwork

Comic strip information
Doctor Who First Doctor strips
Doctor Who Second Doctor strips
Doctor Who Third Doctor strips
Doctor Who Fourth Doctor strips
Four Feather Falls strips
Supercar strips
Fireball XL5 strips
Star Trek Gold Key re-prints
"The Avengers" strips
Tales of the Gold Monkey strips

Comics magazines published in the United Kingdom
Weekly magazines published in the United Kingdom
British humour comics
British science fiction
1951 comics debuts
1984 comics endings
Magazines established in 1951
Magazines disestablished in 1984
Comics based on television series
Fiction set in the 2060s
Action-adventure comics
Defunct British comics
Comics based on Doctor Who
Science fiction comics